Orford is a town in southwestern Victoria, Australia, 250 km west of Melbourne and 40 km north-west of Warrnambool. Orford has several amenities, including a church and war memorial. Orford is located 72 meters above sea level on the banks of the Shaw River.

The area was first settled by the establishment of the Dunmore pastoral run in 1842. In 1856 a town was surveyed and named Orford, apparently after places of that name in Lincolnshire and Suffolk, England. A store was opened in the late 1860s, and a small school opened in 1870.

See also
 Warrnambool
 Shaw River
 Victoria
 Australia

References

Towns in Victoria (Australia)